Mark Sagapolutele (born 15 June 1981), best known by his stage name Mareko, is a New Zealand rapper and hip hop artist of Samoan descent from South Auckland.

Career 
Mareko's career began as a member of the Deceptikonz, a South Auckland rap crew. The group won accolades in 2001, receiving nominations for several New Zealand music awards. Mareko released a solo album, White Sunday, in 2003, which peaked at #4 in New Zealand. Two singles from the album hit the New Zealand singles charts that year: "Mareko (Here to Stay)" (#4) and "Stop, Drop and Roll" (#6; credited to Mareko feat. Deceptikonz). In 2006, Mareko returned to the charts with a guest appearance on Tha Feelstyle's #17 single, "I Do Believe (Tha Remix)".

Discography

Albums

Mixtapes

 Mareko Is the Future (2003) Dawn Raid Entertainment

Singles

References

External links
Official MySpace page

1981 births
Living people
New Zealand rappers
People educated at Manurewa High School